Jorge Luis Siviero (born 13 May 1952) is a former Uruguayan football player and coach. He has played for several clubs in Uruguay, Mexico and Chile during his playing career. He also coached almost ten Chilean clubs and two Venezuelan clubs during his managerial career.

On 8 December 1980, he scored a goal in Uruguay's 6–0 friendly win against Finland, which turned out to be his only appearance for the national team. He was an unused member of Uruguay squad which won 1980 Mundialito.

Titles (Player)
  Cobreloa 1982 (Chilean Championship) and 1986 (Copa Chile)

Titles (Coach)
  Cobreloa 1986 (Copa Polla Gol)
  Deportes Antofagasta 1990 (Torneo Apertura Primera B)
  Santiago Wanderers 1995 (Primera B)

Honours
  Cobreloa 1982 (Top Scorer Chilean Championship)

References

External links
 

1952 births
Living people
Uruguayan footballers
Uruguayan expatriate footballers
Uruguay international footballers
Uruguayan football managers
Racing Club de Montevideo players
C.A. Cerro players
C.A. Rentistas players
Cobreloa footballers
San Marcos de Arica footballers
Expatriate footballers in Chile
Expatriate footballers in Mexico
Expatriate football managers in Chile
Coquimbo Unido managers
Expatriate football managers in Venezuela
Atlético Potosino footballers
Association football forwards
Unión La Calera managers
Deportes Antofagasta managers
UA Maracaibo managers